Melicope glabra is a tree in the [family Rutaceae. The specific epithet  is from the Latin meaning "hairless".

Description
Its leaves have 3 leaflets each, obovate 10-16 centimeters long.

Its flowers have each 4-5 stamens in large panicles.

Distribution and habitat
Melicope glabra grows naturally in Sumatra, Peninsular Malaysia, Singapore, Java and Borneo.

References

glabra
Trees of Malaya
Trees of Java
Trees of Borneo
Trees of Sumatra
Plants described in 1823